CTBA may refer to:

 California Thoroughbred Breeders Association, a non-profit organization located in California, United States
 Chinese Taipei Baseball Association, the national baseball association of Taiwan
 Chinese Taipei Basketball Association, the national basketball association of Taiwan
 Cuatro Torres Business Area, a business park located in Madrid, Spain
 Cricket Training Balls Australia, a business located in Gold Coast, Australia
 Central Texas Beekeepers Association, A beekeeping association promoting education about honey bees and beekeeping. Monthly meetings held in Brenham, Texas, United States
 The Chronic Tuberculosis Alliance, a charitable organization located in Kildare, Ireland